1-Decyne is the organic compound with the formula C8H17C≡CH.  It is a terminal alkyne. A colorless liquid, 1-decyne is used as a model substrate when evaluating methodology in organic synthesis.  It participates in a number of classical reactions including Suzuki-Miyaura couplings, Sonogashira couplings, Huisgen cycloadditions, and borylations.

Under the catalysis of platinum, it reacts with hydrogen to produce decane.

See also
 5-Decyne

References

Hydrocarbons
Alkynes